Kako to da svaki dan? (trans. How Come Every Day?) is the second studio album from Serbian and former Yugoslav rock band YU Grupa.

Album cover
The album cover, designed by D. Krstić, features a photograph of brothers Žika and Dragi Jelić (members of the band) as children.

Track listing

Personnel
Dragi Jelić - guitar, synthesizer, vocals
Bata Kostić - guitar, organ, backing vocals
Žika Jelić - bass guitar, backing vocals
Ratislav Đelmaš - drums, percussion

Additional personnel
Dragan Balać - recorded by

References 
Kako to da svaki dan? at Discogs
 EX YU ROCK enciklopedija 1960-2006,  Janjatović Petar;

External links 
Kako to da svaki dan? at Discogs

YU Grupa albums
1974 albums
Jugoton albums